Etiler is an underground station on the M6 line of the Istanbul Metro in Beşiktaş, Istanbul. It is located beneath Nispetiye Avenue in Etiler. The stations consists of an island platform serviced by two tracks.

The Etiler station was opened on 19 April 2015, along with the entire M6 line.

Layout

References

Istanbul metro stations
Railway stations opened in 2016
2016 establishments in Turkey
Beşiktaş